Tiline is an unincorporated community in Livingston County, Kentucky, United States. It was also known as Cumberland Valley.

References

Unincorporated communities in Livingston County, Kentucky
Unincorporated communities in Kentucky